Concord is an unincorporated community and former post office in southeastern Hampshire County in the U.S. state of West Virginia. It is located along Eldridge Road (County Route 23/2) between the unincorporated communities of Lehew and Yellow Spring.

Geography and setting 
Concord is centered along Eldridge Road (County Route 23/2) in southeastern Hampshire County, West Virginia. A 1933 map of Hampshire County placed Concord at the location of the former L Ridge School.

History 
The land upon which Concord is located was originally part of the Northern Neck Proprietary, a land grant that the exiled Charles II awarded to seven of his supporters in 1649 during the English Interregnum. Following the Restoration in 1660, Charles II finally ascended to the English throne. Charles II renewed the Northern Neck Proprietary grant in 1662, revised it in 1669, and again renewed the original grant favoring original grantee Thomas Colepeper, 2nd Baron Colepeper and Henry Bennet, 1st Earl of Arlington in 1672. In 1681, Bennet sold his share to Lord Colepeper, and Lord Colepeper received a new charter for the entire land grant from James II in 1688. Following the deaths of Lord Colepeper, his wife Margaret, and his daughter Katherine, the Northern Neck Proprietary passed to Katherine's son Thomas Fairfax, 6th Lord Fairfax of Cameron in 1719.

Under Lord Fairfax's ownership, the Cacapon River Valley was predominantly inhabited by English-speaking settlers as early as the late 1730s; most came from Pennsylvania and New Jersey. As settlement progressed during the second half of the 18th century, the fertile land of Hampshire County (including the Cacapon River valley) also attracted German settlers from Pennsylvania and elsewhere in Virginia before and after the American Revolutionary War (1775–1783).

The Concord Meeting House, once located in the vicinity of present-day Concord, was mentioned by early 19th-century Christian Reverend Christy Sine in his journal dating from the 1820s. A church known as the Concord Presbyterian Church also formerly operated in Concord.

The United States Post Office Department established a post office at Concord on March 8, 1876. In July 1918, the department created a  star route, which connected Concord to Gore, Virginia, on the Northwestern Turnpike, by way of Lehew and High View. This postal route ran from Concord to Gore and back six times per week, and became operational on August 1, 1918. Concord's post office remained in operation until March 15, 1933. Following its closure, Concord's mail was routed to the Lehew post office.

Throughout its operation, Concord's post office had seven postmasters, including five grandchildren of settler James Kelso: Ida Cordelia Kelso, John Newton Kelso, Carter Gilbert Kelso, Laura Ellen Kelso, and Olive Willetta Kelso.

In 2000, the Christian-oriented Concord Retreat Center camp and retreat opened in Concord. Its grounds include the old Concord post office and general store.

Notable person 
 Arthur R. M. Spaid, American educator and writer

References

Bibliography

External links 

1876 establishments in West Virginia
1933 disestablishments in West Virginia
Unincorporated communities in Hampshire County, West Virginia
Unincorporated communities in West Virginia